77 Ceti is a single, orange-hued star located 489 light years away in the equatorial constellation of Cetus. It is faintly visible to the naked eye, having an apparent visual magnitude of 5.7. This is an evolved giant star with a stellar classification of K2 III. It is radiating 187 times the Sun's luminosity from its photosphere at an effective temperature of 4,206 K.

References

K-type giants
Cetus (constellation)
Durchmusterung objects
Ceti, 77
016074
012002
0752